Adanac is the backward spelling of "Canada." It can refer to:
 Adanac, Nipissing District, Ontario, Canada
 Adanac, Parry Sound District, Ontario, Canada
 Adanac, Saskatchewan, Canada
 Adanac Military Cemetery in northeastern France
 Adanac Ski Hill in Sudbury, Ontario, Canada
 Coquitlam Adanacs, box lacrosse team in Coquitlam, British Columbia, Canada